Nathalie-Kathleen Mary Lunghi-Joffé (born 26 August 1986) is an English actress.

The daughter of actress Cherie Lunghi and director Roland Joffé, and half-sister of Rowan Joffé, she is perhaps best known for her roles as Geri West in the BBC Three teen drama The Things I Haven't Told You, and Princess Isabelle in the ITV1 comedy drama The Palace.

Filmography

Film

Television

References

External links
 
 
 

1986 births
Living people
Actresses from London
English people of Italian descent
English film actresses
English television actresses